Štrbské Pleso railway station is a junction station in the High Tatras. It serves the settlement of Štrbské Pleso, which is part of the village of Štrba, in the Prešov Region, northeastern Slovakia.

Opened in 1970, the station is the northwestern terminus of the main line operated by the metre gauge Tatra Electric Railway (TEŽ), and the mountain terminus of the Štrbské Pleso – Štrba rack railway, another metre gauge line.

The station is currently owned by Železnice Slovenskej republiky (ŽSR); train services are operated by Železničná spoločnosť Slovensko (ZSSK).

Location

Štrbské Pleso railway station is right in the centre of the Štrbské Pleso village, across the road from the Hotel Toliar.

The Štrbské Pleso village is a ski, tourist, and health resort. It is adjacent to the town of Vysoké Tatry, a conglomerate of separate and different settlements (originally separate villages), the only common feature of which is that they are the main tourist resorts in the Slovak High Tatras.

These resorts are connected with Štrbské Pleso by a common railway network, the TEŽ.

History

The current station was opened in 1970, for the FIS Nordic World Ski Championships 1970.

Facilities
The station building houses information and ticketing facilities, and a restaurant.

Train services

Štrbské Pleso railway station is the junction of the following High Tatras railway lines:

182 Štrba–Štrbské Pleso
183 Poprad-Tatry–Štrbské Pleso railway (the TEŽ's main line)

Interchange
The station offers interchange with local buses.

Services

See also

History of rail transport in Slovakia
Rail transport in Slovakia

References

External links

 Štrbské Pleso railway station on vlaky.net 

High Tatras
Railway stations in Prešov Region
Railway stations opened in 1970
Railway stations in Slovakia opened in the 20th century